The Bishop of Colchester is an episcopal title used by an area bishop of the Church of England Diocese of Chelmsford, in the Province of Canterbury, England.

The current bishop is Roger Morris, former Archdeacon of Worcester, who was consecrated as the Bishop of Colchester on 25 July 2014 at St Paul's Cathedral.

The title takes its name after the town of Colchester in Essex, and was first created under the Suffragan Bishops Act 1534. The suffragan bishops have been under the jurisdiction of a number of different dioceses. They were originally appointed for the Diocese of London, but changed in 1845 for the Diocese of Rochester and again in 1877 for the Diocese of St Albans. With the creation of the Diocese of Chelmsford in 1914, the suffragan bishops now come under the jurisdiction of the Bishop of Chelmsford. The bishops suffragan of Colchester have been area bishops since the Chelmsford area scheme was erected in 1983.

List of bishops

References

External links
 Area Bishop of Colchester- official diocesan website
 Crockford's Clerical Directory - Listings

Bishops of Colchester
Anglican suffragan bishops in the Diocese of Chelmsford